Hoover is a city in Jefferson and Shelby counties in north central Alabama, United States. Hoover is the largest suburban city in Alabama and the 6th largest city in Alabama. The city had a population of 92,606 as of the 2020 US Census. Hoover is part of the Birmingham-Hoover, AL Metropolitan Statistical Area and is also included in the Birmingham-Hoover-Talladega, AL Combined Statistical Area. Hoover's territory is along the foothills of the Appalachian Mountains.

The Birmingham Barons Minor League Baseball team, which traces its history to 1885, played its home games at the 10,800-seat Hoover Metropolitan Stadium until 2013, when it moved to Regions Field in the Parkside District of Birmingham.

History

This suburban area near the foothills of the Appalachian Mountains had been known as the Green Valley community since the 1930s; it was mostly a bedroom or residential community into the late 1970s and early 1980s. The City of Hoover was incorporated in 1967, named for William H. Hoover (1890 - 1979), a local insurance company owner.

On September 8, 1980, the city annexed the Riverchase business and residential community, gaining large office buildings, employers, and workers to increase the city's tax base. When Interstate I-459 was opened, a major interchange with Interstate I-65 was constructed within the borders of Hoover, improving access.

In 1986 the Riverchase Galleria multi-use complex opened; it has significantly increased the tax revenue for the city. It has also attracted new residents and businesses to the area. The city has grown extremely fast, aided by its annexations of territory as well as new developments. The city has expanded its facilities, and now operates a Municipal Center, Library, and Public Safety Center. The city expects to continue to increase in population, which has risen significantly since 2008. It numbered 81,619 as of the 2010 Census.

Geography

Many major highways pass through the city limits, including I-65, I-459, and U.S. Route 31.

Government

The municipal government has operated under the Mayor-Council form of government since incorporation. The Mayor and City Council are elected on a non-partisan basis to concurrent four-year terms of office, which begin on October 1 of election year. Policy-making and legislative authority is vested in the City Council, which consists of seven "at-large" elected members (prior to 2004, the council consisted of five at-large members.) (Candidates for at-large elections must gain a majority of voters; such a system has been found in other cities in Alabama to limit the ability of minority voters to elect candidates of their choice.)

The city council is responsible for considering local resolutions and ordinances, adopting an annual budget, and appointing members to local boards and committees. The Mayor is responsible for carrying out and enforcing the city's policies and ordinances.

Economy
The Riverchase Galleria shopping-hotel-office complex generates tax revenues for the city; it is also the location of numerous retail, hotel, and office workers. The Riverchase Office Park, and other office parks and buildings throughout Hoover, house many large corporations. Major shopping centers in the city include Riverchase Galleria on US 31, Patton Creek on SR 150, and Village at Lee Branch on US 280. The Central Business District is intersected by US 31, SR 150, and US 280. I-65 and I-459 intersect in the city.

Largest taxpayers 
Hoover 2015 annual financial report, ranking by largest sales and use taxpayers:

 Costco
 Wal-Mart
 Sam's Club
 Belk
 Target
 Regions Bank
 Publix
 Home Depot
 Best Buy
 Macy's

Largest employers
 Blue Cross and Blue Shield of Alabama (company headquarters) - 3,000
 Hoover City Schools - 1,850
 Regions Financial (operations center) - 1,765
 AT&T Inc. (data center) - 1,143
 City of Hoover - 745
 Walmart (two Walmart Supercenters and one Walmart Neighborhood Market store) - 650
 T-Mobile 500
 BE&K - 302

Public safety

Hoover Fire Department is a full-time career department operating from ten fire stations throughout the city. The city has one battalion. There are eight engine companies, two quints, one ladder truck, three ALS rescue/ambulances, and two battalion chief cars. All engine companies are staffed with a minimum of three people, with at least two being firefighter/paramedics. All engines are classified ALS (Advanced Life Support). The department also operates one heavy rescue truck, and one hazmat unit. Hoover Fire Department holds a Class 1 ISO rating. In 2016, the department responded to over 10,000 calls.

Hoover operates its own enhanced 911 emergency call center, which has 24 operator positions, 2 communication supervisors, 1 department manager and is staffed 24/7.

Hoover provides traffic, severe weather, disaster information, and details on special events on low-power AM radio (1610 kHz).

Demographics

2000 census
At the 2000 census, there were 62,742 people in 25,191 households, including 17,406 families, in the city. The racial makeup of the city was 87.66% White, 6.77% Black, 0.16% Native American, 2.89% Asian, 0.03% Pacific Islander, 1.40% from other races, and 1.09% from two or more races. 3.79% of the population were Hispanic or Latino of any race.

Of the 25,191 households 33.4% had children under the age of 18 living with them, 59.4% were married couples living together, 7.2% had a female householder with no husband present, and 30.9% were non-families. 25.9% of households were one person and 6.3% were one person aged 65 or older. The average household size was 2.47 and the average family size was 3.00.

The age distribution was 24.8% under the age of 18, 7.9% from 18 to 24, 32.6% from 25 to 44, 23.8% from 45 to 64, and 10.9% 65 or older. The median age was 36 years. For every 100 females, there were 95.1 males. For every 100 females age 18 and over, there were 91.5 males.

According to a 2007 estimate, The median household income was $75,365, and the median family income was $89,513. Males had a median income of $55,660 versus $34,836 for females. The per capita income for the city was $33,361. About 2.1% of families and 3.4% of the population were below the poverty line, including 2.7% of those under age 18 and 3.9% of those age 65 or over.

2010 census
At the 2010 census, there were 84,126 people in 32,478 households, including 22,476 families, in the city. The racial makeup of the city was 75.1% White, 14.8% Black, 0.2% Native American, 5.1% Asian, 0.0% Pacific Islander, 3.2% from other races, and 1.5% from two or more races. 6.0% of the population were Hispanic or Latino of any race.

Of the 32,478 households 33.0% had children under the age of 18 living with them, 56.1% were married couples living together, 10.0% had a female householder with no husband present, and 30.8% were non-families. 25.8% of households were one person and 7.6% were one person aged 65 or older. The average household size was 2.50 and the average family size was 3.02.

The age distribution was 25.0% under the age of 18, 7.8% from 18 to 24, 28.7% from 25 to 44, 26.6% from 45 to 64, and 12.0% 65 or older. The median age was 37 years. For every 100 females, there were 92.5 males. For every 100 females age 18 and over, there were 92.4 males.

The median household income was $72,960 and the median family income was $94,066. Males had a median income of $65,023 versus $44,525 for females. The per capita income for the city was $39,141. About 3.4% of families and 5.6% of the population were below the poverty line, including 6.6% of those under age 18 and 3.5% of those age 65 or over.

2020 census

As of the 2020 United States census, there were 92,606 people, 32,461 households, and 23,672 families residing in the city.

Transportation

Hoover is served by two interstate highways, 65 and 459, with a major interchange near the center of the city. Major arterial roads include U.S. Route 31 as a north–south route through the middle of the city, U.S. Route 280 in the eastern portion of the city, Route 150 as an east–west road connecting the city center to the western side, and Valleydale Road connecting Route 31 and Route 280.
Hoover is also served by the Birmingham-Jefferson County Transit Authority.

Communities

 Acton
 Altadena
 Bluff Park
 Caldwell Mill
 Chace Lake
 Country Club Highlands
 Deer Valley
 Georgetown
 Green Valley
 Greystone
 Inverness
 Lake Crest
 Lake Cyrus
 Lake Wilborn
 Patton Chapel
 Pinewood
 Riverchase
 Rocky Ridge
 Ross Bridge
 Russet Woods
 Shades Mountain
 Shoal Creek
 Southlake
 The Preserve
 Trace Crossings

Parks

Aldridge Gardens
Bluff Park Community Center and Playground
Blue Ridge Park
Georgetown Park
Howard Lake Park
Inverness Park
Loch Haven Park
Moss Rock Preserve
Ross Park
Russet Woods Park
Star Lake Park
Sertoma Park
Veterans Park
Wildflower Park
Chace Lake Park

Education

Primary and secondary schools

Hoover is served by Hoover City Schools. It has ten elementary schools, three middle schools, and two high schools, Spain Park High School and Hoover High School. Both schools have ranked high for excellent academics, being rated close to the top five-hundred schools in the country. During the 2005–2006 school year, some 2,451 students enrolled in Hoover High School, 1,400 in Spain Park High School, with a total of 11,433 students in the Hoover City School system. Spain Park received the National Blue Ribbon Award in 2008.

Berry Middle School, which served as the city's first high school before the present Hoover High was constructed, was closed after the 2005–2006 academic year. Students were moved to a new Berry Middle School constructed near the site of Spain Park High School. A poll of residents in 2007 favored selling the school, possibly to the independent Shades Mountain Christian School. Simmons Middle School and Bumpus Middle School are the city's other middle schools.

Given the population expansion, the city built Riverchase Elementary to relieve overcrowding of some schools. The student population bubble is advancing in the system, and in the 2011–2012 academic year, Bumpus Middle School and its students were relocated to the former freshman center of Hoover High School. The former Bumpus site became Brock's Gap Intermediate School in 2011. The former Berry site became the current Bumpus Middle School in 2011. Brock's Gap served 5th and 6th graders until 2018 when Hoover Rezoning went into effect. They now serve 3rd, 4th, and 5th graders. Bumpus Middle School served only 7th and 8th graders until 2018 because of Hoover Rezoning. They now serve 6th, 7th, and 8th graders.

Colleges and universities
The Shelby-Hoover campus of the Jefferson State Community College is in Shelby County, is in Hoover, near Spain Park High School. Faulkner University has a campus on Valleydale Road; The University of Alabama in Birmingham (UAB) in downtown Birmingham is only 8–10 miles away, and features the premier medical school of Alabama.

Miscellaneous education
The Birmingham Supplementary School Inc. (BSS, バーミングハム日本語補習校 Bāminguhamu Nihongo Hoshūkō), a part-time Japanese school, holds its classes at the Shelby-Hoover campus. Its office is at the Honda Manufacturing of Alabama, LLC facility in unincorporated Talladega County, near Lincoln. The school opened on September 1, 2001.

Media
Hoover has one television station, WBMA, branded as ABC 33/40, with its studio within the Hoover city limits. The metro area has TV broadcasting stations that serve the Birmingham-Anniston-Tuscaloosa Designated Market Area (DMA), as defined by Nielsen Media Research. Charter Communications, Bright House Networks, and  AT&T U-verse provide cable television service to specific communities in Hoover. DirecTV and Dish Network provide direct broadcast satellite television, including both local and national channels.

No radio stations operate from Hoover, although residents are served by numerous stations from the Birmingham market. (WERC-FM is licensed to Hoover but its studio is located in Birmingham.)

Two newspapers serve Hoover: the Over the Mountain Journal newspaper, published twice monthly and delivered for free to select neighborhoods in Hoover and nearby communities; and the Hoover Sun, published monthly and mailed for free to roughly 24,000 homes and businesses in Hoover.

Notable people
 Ben Chapman, was an outfielder and manager in Major League Baseball. Chapman's playing reputation was eclipsed by the role he played in 1947 as manager of the Phillies, antagonizing Jackie Robinson
George Pickens, National Football League wide receiver for the Pittsburgh Steelers
Chris Richards, American professional soccer player who plays as a center-back for Premier League club Crystal Palace and the United States national team

Points of interest
 Aldridge Botanical Gardens
 Hoover Metropolitan Stadium (formerly Regions Park), home of the SEC baseball tournament
 Riverchase Galleria
 Ross Bridge Golf Resort and Spa, which boasts the third-longest golf course in the world
 Moss Rock Preserve
 The Library Theatre

References

External links

City of Hoover
Hoover Alabama Chamber of Commerce
Hoover City Schools

 
Populated places established in 1967
Cities in Alabama
Cities in Jefferson County, Alabama
Cities in Shelby County, Alabama
Birmingham metropolitan area, Alabama